Winona Grace MacInnis  (née Woodsworth; July 25, 1905 – July 10, 1991) was a socialist Canadian politician.  She was the first woman from British Columbia elected to the House of Commons of Canada, as well as the first wife of a former Canadian Member of Parliament to be elected to the House of Commons in her own right, rather than by directly succeeding her husband in a by-election following his death.

The daughter of Co-operative Commonwealth Federation founding leader J. S. Woodsworth and the wife of long serving CCF MP Angus MacInnis, Grace MacInnis championed issues such as family planning, affordable housing, abortion rights and women's equality. She was a founding member of the CCF and served as an MLA in the Legislative Assembly of British Columbia from 1941 to 1945, on the executive of the national CCF, and in the Canadian House of Commons as a Member of Parliament representing the CCF's successor, the New Democratic Party from 1965 until her retirement in 1974.

MacInnis represented the British Columbia riding of Vancouver—Kingsway. She was the only woman MP elected in the 1968 election.

In 1974, she was made an Officer of the Order of Canada "in recognition of a lifetime of service to Canada as teacher, author and parliamentarian". In 1979, she was a recipient of the Governor General's Award in Commemoration of the Persons Case. In 1990, she was awarded the Order of British Columbia.

Personal life
MacInnis was born on July 25, 1905, in Winnipeg, Manitoba, Canada.  She was the eldest among six children of J. S. Woodsworth, the first leader of Co-operative Commonwealth Federation (CCF, later the New Democratic Party), and Lucy Lillian Staples Woodsworth.  Their lives and enthusiasm about politics highly influenced MacInnis' ideals as a politician, and a feminist.  Her father was a minister of a comfortable Methodist parish.  Her mother, Lucy, was a teacher and a loving mother to her children, also was known as a liberated thinker who taught her children about birth control, which was illegal at that time.  The family had discussion frequently, which encouraged the children to express their thoughts freely. In the year of 1953, she published biography of her father: J.S. Woodsworth- A Man to Remember.

After attending the University of Manitoba and the Sorbonne, she became a teacher, but soon left her career to assistant her father in 1931, and later acted as secretary of the CCF party. She married Angus MacInnis in January 1932 who spent 27 years as a CCF member of Vancouver-Kingsway in the House of Commons until his retirement in 1957 due to his failing health, which also confined MacInnis' activities as well. In 1941, she was elected to the British Columbia legislature as one of two members for the riding of Vancouver-Burrard and remained until 1945. In the year of 1960, she was suffered from rheumatoid arthritis which confined her activities completely. It took about 4 years for her to be quiescent. In 1964, her husband Angus MacInnis died. She rested and resumed her activities in NDP, and was elected as a Party Member of Vancouver-Kingsway in 1965. She held senior positions in both CCF Party and its successor, the NDP, and was president of the British Columbia Party for two terms, both on constituency and provincial levels.  She received unanimous support from her party, and continued her activities for 35 years.  MacInnis died on July 10, 1991.

Career
During her career, MacInnis debated issues in the House of Commons concerning housing and abortion. In 1967, she was responsible for bringing the issue of housing to the government's attention, arguing that it was the main problem in Canada. This exchange led to the increase in interest rates of NHA loans from 7 1/4 % to 8 1/4%, which was advantageous, however, qualifying for the loans still remained difficult.  She explained that Canadians couldn't qualify unless their income was at least $8,000 a year(the equivalent of $62,101.69 in 2020 dollars) and for those who could afford it, it was costly to carry a loan for an extended period. At the same meeting, MacInnis addressed abortion and how it is necessary for the option to be available for women if the child has a possibility of being born unhealthy, their physical or mental health was imperilled or the pregnancy was caused by rape. Her precautionary measures for abortion rights were that two registered physicians had to prescribe it for any of the previous reasons and she emphasized that anyone could apply. One of her reasons why these rights would be helpful was because they would reduce the amount of wrongly performed illegal abortions.

One problem that MacInnis recognized during her time in Parliament was that men don't usually engage in issues involving women.   MacInnis advocated for those on lower incomes, in hopes of creating more opportunities for those who aren’t able to create their own.  She highlighted the importance of the ability for women to not have to choose between work and having children, and considered the need for more childcare centres so this could be made possible.  In addition, she pressed for advancements towards training and education in order for all classes of women to qualify for better jobs.

Legacy
MacInnis' papers (1.6 m) are held by the special collections division of the library of the University of British Columbia.  They include the diaries, correspondence and speeches of her husband.  The university also holds Angus Maclnnis Memorial Collection, the Angus Maclnnis Papers, and the Lillie d'Easum Collection, which include material by or about MacInnis. There is also a Grace MacInnis fonds (4.6 m) at Library and Archives Canada. Archival reference number is R5492.

References

External links
 

1905 births
1991 deaths
British Columbia Co-operative Commonwealth Federation MLAs
20th-century Canadian politicians
Canadian socialists
Members of the House of Commons of Canada from British Columbia
Members of the Order of British Columbia
Officers of the Order of Canada
New Democratic Party MPs
Canadian feminists
Canadian socialist feminists
Women MLAs in British Columbia
Women members of the House of Commons of Canada
Canadian Officers of the Order of the British Empire
20th-century Canadian women politicians
Governor General's Award in Commemoration of the Persons Case winners